The Wheel at ICON Park is a  tall giant ferris wheel at ICON Park in Orlando, Florida, United States. Under the name Orlando Eye, it opened on April 29, 2015.  The wheel was reported to be in the early stages of planning in March 2011, at which point it was proposed for completion in mid-2014, but the opening date was subsequently delayed to late 2014 and then to early 2015.

The attraction was renamed the Coca-Cola Orlando Eye in 2016; the ICON Orlando in 2018; and The Wheel at ICON Park Orlando in 2019. The most recent rename included a re-branding of the property to become ICON Park.

Design and construction
The Wheel at ICON Park is described as an observation wheel because "this is a stabilized-driven (capsule) that gives you a really smooth experience on the way around, so it doesn't feel like when you're at 400-feet, that you're swinging around in mid-air". According to its official website, The Wheel at ICON Park is the first wheel ever to use such a system in combination with a suspended "ski lift capsule design".

The wheel was reported to be in the early stages of planning in March 2011, with completion due in mid-2014, and was approved by county commissioners in September 2012.

In January 2013, it was reported that the expected opening date had been pushed back to "by Thanksgiving November 2014". Erection of the main support structure began in December 2013. In April 2014 it was reported that completion had been further delayed until early 2015.

Installation of the 30 air-conditioned passenger capsules, each of which can carry up to 15 people, began in mid-January 2015, and the last capsule was installed on February 5. In mid-February 2015, it was announced that the soft opening was scheduled for May 1, followed by a grand opening ceremony on May 4. The Orlando Eye carried its first passenger on April 29, 2015.

Malfunctions
On July 3, 2015, at around 4:00 p.m., a few months after operations began, the Eye experienced a technical fault with the system that monitors the wheel position, causing the system to automatically shut down, stranding about 66 riders for approximately three hours.

On December 31, 2022, the Wheel malfunctioned and suffered from a power failure around 6:20 p.m. Orange County fire crews had to rescue more than 60 people from the ride. Despite reports of a small fire, no injuries were reported. The ride remained closed until February 10th, 2023.

Rebranding
On July 28, 2016, the Orlando Eye followed its London counterpart in becoming sponsored by Coca-Cola and was renamed the Coca-Cola Orlando Eye. The deal included the renaming of the Eye and four new "Surprise and Delight" capsules, which are branded capsules with a cooler of soda and selfie sticks.

On March 11, 2018, it was rebranded again as ICON Orlando. On April 4, 2019, it was rebranded once again to The Wheel at ICON Park.

References

External links
 

Ferris wheels in the United States
Merlin Entertainments Group
Tourist attractions in Orlando, Florida
Buildings and structures in Orlando, Florida
Amusement rides introduced in 2015
2015 establishments in Florida